Giovanni Ludovico of Saluzzo (also spelled Gian Ludovico; c. 1496–1563) was marquess of Saluzzo in 1528–1529.

Biography 

The second eldest son of Ludovico II of Saluzzo and Margaret of Foix-Candale, he was imprisoned by his mother Marguerite of Foix when, during the Italian Wars, he sided for Emperor Charles V (the marquesses of Saluzzo were traditional allied/subjects of the Kings of France). In 1528 he was freed by a popular insurrection, and elected as Marquess in lieu of his brother, Michele Antonio, who had died in battle.

One year later however, Francis I of France deposed him, replacing him with his brother Francesco. Giovanni Ludovico subsequently tried to recover his rule in Saluzzo with the Emperors help, however he was unsuccessful. As such the marquisate entered the control of the French monarchy.

References 

1490s births
1563 deaths
Giovanni Ludovico
15th-century condottieri
Giovanni Ludovico